Ait Ourir is a town and municipality in Al Haouz Province, Marrakesh-Safi, Morocco. At the time of the 2004 census, the commune had a total population of 20,005 people living in 3767 households.

Landmarks
The town, described by Footprint Travel Guides as "rather undistinguished", contains a number of important buildings, a hospital, cemetery and several schools such as College Moulay Rachid and Ecole Riyad. The souk of Ait Ourir is of importance to trade in Al Haouz province, with a large market trading agricultural produce, camels, sheep and other items here. A shop at the souk sells tagines cooked over kanounes (cauldrons). Glaoui appears to be an ancient village in the area to the southeast of the town which has effectively become a suburb which contains a kasbah and a mosque. To the southeast is the Ait Ourir Forest. Quartz is mined within the municipality. There are eucalyptus and olive plantations in the area.

Notable people
Abdelaziz Lemsioui (1944-) - Deputy of Commune from 1984 to 1992 and Regional Councillor of Marrakech-Tensift-Al Haouz from 1996 to 2000.
Abdelkebir Ouaddar, Equestrian

References

External links
Website

Populated places in Al Haouz Province
Municipalities of Morocco